Sublime Massacre Corpóreo (Portuguese for "Sublime Corporeal Massacre") is the sophomore studio album by Portuguese grindcore band Holocausto Canibal. It was released in January 2000 by So Die Music, who had previously released their debut opus Gonorreia Visceral. The album was recorded in 2001 at Grave Studios Studios, in Braga, Portugal, and was produced by Pedro Alves.

This record became known in the Portuguese scene for songs as "Violada Pela Motosserra", "Porno Hardgore" and "Cadavérica Ejaculação Espasmódica" which became classics of the genre in their country and featured current Anathema keyboardist, Daniel Cardoso, on keyboards.

"Sublime Massacre Corpóreo" defined their sound and was their first record to cross the Portuguese border thanks to the wide distribution through Europe and North and South America. It was also this album that permitted Holocausto Canibal to go abroad, this time with C. Guerra as session vocalist, who entered the band following the departure of Ricardo S. in November 2003 who decided to dedicate his time to his newborn daughter.

It features four remixes by Portuguese electronic outfit Stealing Orchestra.

Track listing
All music composed by Holocausto Canibal. All lyrics written by Z. Pedro.

Credits
Holocausto Canibal 
Ricardo Silva - vocals 
Nuno Pereira - guitar
Jose Pedro - bass 
Ivan Saraiva - drums
Daniel Cardoso - keyboards

Production
Pedro Alves – sound engineering, producing, mixing, mastering
Christophe Szpajdel – logo

References

2002 albums
Holocausto Canibal albums